The 2002 San Miguel Beermen season was the 28th season of the franchise in the Philippine Basketball Association (PBA).

Draft pick

Transactions

National team
Four members of the San Miguel Beermen namely Danny Seigle, Olsen Racela, two-time MVP Danny Ildefonso and newly acquired Dondon Hontiveros from the defunct Tanduay ballclub were chosen to comprised the 15-man lineup of the Philippine national team that will participate in the Asian Games in Busan, South Korea in October. SMB coach Jong Uichico was given the tasks to handle the nationals. Assistant coach Siot Tanquingcen takes over the coaching chores of the Beermen on an interim basis. During the Governor's Cup, Danny Seigle, Olsen Racela and Dondon Hontiveros played for Philippine team-Selecta while Danny Ildefonso played for Philippine team-Hapee Toothpaste.

Occurrences
The July 11 game between San Miguel and Red Bull at the Cuneta Astrodome had a bench-clearing incident in which 13 players of San Miguel and 11 from Red Bull were fined P10,000 by the Commissioner's office, the melee started during the third quarter when Beermen import Art Long threw a punch on Red Bull import Tony Lang, who retaliated with a shove, both imports were thrown out and when Lang was ushered out, he confronted the SMB import upon entering the locker room but was stopped by a female security officer. 

Danny Seigle never played a single game for the Beermen in the season after his stint with the national training pool when he suffered a torn right Achilles tendon.

Roster

Elimination round

Games won

References

San Miguel Beermen seasons
San